Boris Konkov (born 15 December 1937) is a Soviet equestrian. He competed at the 1960 Summer Olympics and the 1964 Summer Olympics.

References

External links
 

1937 births
Living people
Russian male equestrians
Soviet male equestrians
Olympic equestrians of the Soviet Union
Equestrians at the 1960 Summer Olympics
Equestrians at the 1964 Summer Olympics
Sportspeople from Moscow